Forensic accountants are experienced auditors, accountants, and investigators of legal and financial documents that are hired to look into possible suspicions of fraudulent activity within a company; or are hired by a company who may just want to prevent fraudulent activities from occurring. They also provide services in areas such as accounting, antitrust, damages, analysis, valuation, and general consulting. Forensic accountants have also been used in divorces, bankruptcy, insurance claims, personal injury claims, fraudulent claims, construction, royalty audits, and tracking terrorism by investigating financial records. Many forensic accountants work closely with law enforcement personnel and lawyers during investigations and often appear as expert witnesses during trials.

Tasks performed
Forensic accounting or forensic accountancy has been used since the time of the ancient Egyptians when Pharaoh had scribes account for his gold and other assets. These scribes worked in Pharaoh's courts and were charged with fraud prevention and detection. Their role stayed much the same until the turn of the 20th century. As an accountant they must have knowledge of the latest accounting standards and procedures, be proficient in many different Financial Reporting Systems being used, and be able to provide recommendations that will strengthen internal controls.  They also need to have an understanding of the different monetary units used internationally due to the different types used in foreign accounts or companies. As an auditor they must perform regular financial audits to prevent possible situations that could lead to fraud. As an attorney they must know the current Federal and State laws and regulations, and should be able to approve or disprove suspicions of fraud.  They may also be called to be an expert witness in a court trial so they must be able to communicate well and at a level that is understandable by individuals without accounting knowledge.

As an investigator they must investigate and gather evidence to be presented in a court of law; be able to investigate complaints, allegations, and tips of suspected fraud; must be able to sort, analyze, and compare data in support of an investigation; and must have a working relationship with the investigating and prosecuting agencies involved.

When acting as an expert witness in court proceedings in Federal Court in the United States a forensic accountant is required to give testimony which is based upon sufficient facts or data and is the product of reliable principles and methods, and they are required to have applied the principles and methods reliably to the facts of the case.
When acting as an expert witness in court proceedings in the United Kingdom a forensic accountant is obliged to give "objective, unbiased opinion on matters within [their] expertise".
For a comparison with French practices, see a study of "Forensic Accountants at Work".

Information needs
Forensic accountants need to have a great deal of access to information regarding the company they are investigating or assisting.  The information will determine how much a person actually makes, the worth of a business, if there has been fraudulent activity, who committed the fraud, everyone involved, how much was taken from the company, where the money went, and how much can be recovered.  Some of the obvious information needs consist of the financial statements, bank statements, credit statements, and computers.  Some of the less obvious information needs consist of address books, emails, phone numbers, spreadsheets, electronic memos, and so forth.

Forensic Investigation/Audit
Forensic accountants need to advance fully to become all rounded forensic investigators or auditors that can handle any type of situation requiring financial or digital forensic skills. These days white collar criminals are high tech to the extent of using computers to defraud and perpetrate financial related crimes in such a manner that a traditional forensic accountant can not be able to trace. Sometimes investigation involves e-mail tracing to ascertain intent an element that must exist for any one to be convicted of fraud. Certified Forensic Investigation Professionals have such training. They are part forensic accountants and part digital forensic experts.

Financial statements
Financial statements are very important to forensic accountants because they must analyze the information given on the statements and compare that information to other sources.  The balance sheet, income statement, statement of owner's equity, and statement of cash flows are the four most important financial statements that forensic accountants look at; however, they also look at business plans and disclosures in footnotes.

The balance sheet shows the financial position of a company at a given point in time.  It lists the company's assets, liabilities, and owner's equity while showing the resources of the company.  The income statement shows the results of the company's operations during a period of time, revenues minus expenses for a given time period ending at a specified date.  The statement of owner's equity, also known as the statement of retained earnings or the equity statement, reconciles the beginning and ending retained earnings for the period, using information such as net income from the other financial statements.  The statement of cash flows lists the sources and uses of cash and divides them into operating, investing, and financing activities.  J-score is one of the tools of identification of frauds in Forensic Accounting. This score was derived by Mayur Joshi in the year 2011. 
They evaluate the company's ability to pay its bills while indicating if there is enough cash for routine operations.  Some other financial documents that need to be examined include the general journal, general ledger, sales journal, purchases journal, cash receipts journal and cash disbursements journal.

Even though forensic accountants need to analyze and compare financial statements most cases of fraudulent activity will not be in plain sight.  Most fraudulent activity will be hidden and manipulated to the point that forensic accountants must dig deep into the company.

Bank statements
Bank statements are also needed in order to investigate a company.  The owner's personal bank statements are needed as well as the company's bank statements.  If the company is the one who wanted the investigation to be conducted then they most likely suspect an employee.  Therefore, bank statements would be needed from the individual being investigated.  They will show how much cash is coming into and out of the company.  They will also show where the money is going and where it is coming from, who are the clients, and if any money has been transferred to foreign accountants.

Once again, if the owner of the company was performing fraudulent activities then the discrepancies would not be in plain sight; the owner would most likely have foreign accountants with no trace to them.  If evidence of a foreign account can be found then there may also be evidence on what the individual has been purchasing with that account, when it was opened, how much has been deposited, and if there is a valid reason for the individual to have a foreign account open.  If the company is based overseas, then that alone is reason enough to have a foreign account.  However, if it is an individual's personal account and they put the account under a different name (mother's maiden name who died 10 years ago) then there is enough reason to believe the individual is trying to hide something.

Credit statements
Credit statements can show evidence that bank statements may not, but once again, the evidence will not be in plain sight.  Forensic accountants must look to see if there were any big purchases that do not match the individual's income, for instance, a new vehicle.  Credit statements may also reveal that the individual has been taking several exotic vacations over the past few years that are outside of their means.

Education
A person in this field should have at least 2 years experience in auditing or accounting and a Bachelor's degree in Accounting or a related field. Some forensic accountants are Certified Forensic Accounting Professionals (CFAPs), Certified Forensic Investigation Professionals (CFIPs), Certified Public Accountants (CPAs), Chartered Accountants (CAs), Certified Management Accountants or Chartered Professional Accountants (CMA/CPA), Certified Fraud Examiners (CFEs), Certified in Financial Forensics (CFFs), Certified Forensic Accountant (CRFAC), Certified Valuation Analysts (CVAs), Investigative & Forensic Accountants (IFAs), or Chartered Certified Forensic Accountants (CCFA). Some have other professional certifications. The comparison of all these certifications is available on different third party media portals.

Certified Forensic Investigation Professional (CFIP)
The Certified Forensic Investigation Professional program for potential investigators' knowledge and competence in professional forensic investigation skills in various subjects include:
Criminology & Psychology
Principles and Practice of Accounting
Computer and digital forensics 
Fraud Auditing and Forensic Accounting
Criminal Investigations
Studies on Fraud and Corruption
Investigation Law
Investigative accounting

Certified Forensic Investigation Professionals have the following skills sets:
Fraud Prevention and Detection
Forensic Investigation
Criminal Investigation
Design and Implementation of Preventive Controls
Digital forensics
Forensic Accounting
Assets tracing in Divorce, Bankruptcy and Money Laundering Cases and
Expert witnessing

Basic Entry qualifications:
A bachelor's degree plus
3 years experience in finance, auditing, investigation, accounting, security and law enforcement, digital forensics or cyber security or
High school diploma with over 5 years experience in finance, auditing, investigation, accounting, security and law enforcement, digital forensics or cyber security. Those with certifications like CPA, ACCA, CA, CFE, or equivalent professional qualification with over 8 years’ experience in auditing or investigation may become fully certified via the grandfathering process.
The CFIP credential was first put into use in 2012.

Certified Forensic Accountant (CRFAC)
The Certified Forensic Accountant credentialing process offered by the  American Board of Forensic Accounting is used to assess the knowledge and competence of Certified Public Accountants (CPAs) in professional forensic accounting services in a multitude of areas.

Forensic accountants may be involved in both litigation support (providing assistance on a given case, primarily related to the calculation or estimation of economic damages and related issues) and investigative accounting (looking into illegal activities).

The CRFAC covers the broad base of forensic accounting knowledge. The CRFAC credential was first put into use in 1993. The American Board of Forensic Accounting offers many programs. For effective learning, professionals will need expert training in the practices of forensic accounting. The American Board of Forensic Accounting offers the "Forensic Accounting Review".

Certified Fraud Examiner (CFE)

The Association of Certified Fraud Examiners offers the Certified Fraud Examiner (CFE) credential to members involved in fraud prevention, deterrence, detection and investigation. Candidate eligibility is based on a point system (representing a combination of formal education, professional certifications and relevant work experience) and a minimum of two years of anti-fraud professional experience. To earn the CFE credential, candidates must pass a four-part examination and abide by a code of professional ethics.

The terms forensic accounting and fraud examination are often used interchangeably, however they are not the same discipline. Forensic accounting focuses on litigation support and covers both fraud and non-fraud situations (e.g. economic damages, personal injury, family law, etc.). Fraud examination concerns itself exclusively with fraud-related matters and encompasses the prevention, deterrence, detection and investigation of fraud.

The CFE credential is recognized by partner organizations leading the global fight against fraud and including, among others, the Federal Bureau of Investigation, the Securities and Exchange Commission, the Internal Revenue Service, the Ontario Provincial Police, the City of London Police and the City of Toronto Auditor General's Office.

Certified in Financial Forensics (CFF)
The American Institute of Certified Public Accountants has a subject matter expertise credential for forensic accountants.  The credential is Certified in Financial Forensics ("CFF"). "The CFF credential is granted exclusively to CPAs who demonstrate considerable expertise in forensic accounting through their knowledge, skills, and experience. The CFF encompasses fundamental and specialized forensic accounting skills that CPA practitioners apply in a variety of service areas, including: bankruptcy and insolvency; computer forensic analysis; family law; valuations; fraud prevention, detection, and response; financial statement misrepresentation; and economic damages calculations."

The average salary for a forensic accountant in the US is around $74,000.00.  A forensic accountant in New York could make up to $102,655.00 while a forensic accountant in Orlando usually only makes $56,071.00.

Forensic accountants must be able to work independently and be able to travel at least 10-15% of the time. Some forensic accountants acting as consultants are not paid on salary and are rather contracted to do a specific task for a company. A decision is made between the organization and the accountant on what is to be paid if the job is done in a specific amount of time and the accountant is paid upon completion. These contracts can range from a few thousand to several million depending on the time taken and the specialized skills, if any, that are needed.

Certified Valuation Analyst (CVA)

A Certified Valuation Analyst (CVA) is a designation issued by the National Association of Certified Valuation Analysts (NACVA) to accounting professionals who have knowledge and expertise of business valuation standards. Requirements for the CVA designation include holding an active, valid, and unrevoked CPA license or holding a business degree (i.e., in management, economics, finance, marketing, accounting, or another business field) and/or an MBA (master of business administration) or higher business degree from an accredited college or university and two years or more of full-time or equivalent experience in business valuation and related disciplines for non-CPAs. In addition to these requirements, CVA applicants must complete and pass specified training courses and exams and complete a case study or submit an actual and sanitized fair market value report, prepared during the last 12 months, for peer review.

NACVA's recertification process is designed to ensure that credential holders keep up with changes in the constantly evolving valuation field and that they continue to adhere to the industry's high standards. Recertification is required every three years.

CVAs are used to perform business valuations in a wide variety of instances. These can include matters related to mergers and acquisitions, buy/sell agreements, determination of damages in third-party liability matters, dissenting shareholder actions, business disputes, divorce settlements, estate and succession/exit planning, initial public offerings, partner disputes, public domain matters and fraud and arson defences that involve insurance values.

Chartered Certified Forensic Accountant (CCFA)

The Chartered Certified Forensic Accountant, CCFA designation is a global forensic accounting designation awarded by the International Institute of Certified Forensic Accountants, Inc. (IICFA). To be awarded with the CCFA designation, one must pass all three (3) levels of the CCFA qualifying exams and must obtain two years post qualification or professional experience with a reputable forensic accounting firm.

CCFA candidates must hold a bachelor's degree and pass all 15 papers of the CCFA Exam with an 80% pass Mark.

CCFA Level 1 Exam

1.1 Principles of Forensic Accounting

1.2 Principles of Fraud Examination

1.3 Forensic Criminology & Legal Studies

1.4 Financial Crime Investigation

CCFA Level 2 Exam

2.1 Computer & Digital Forensics

2.2 Criminal Investigation

2.3 Corporate Fraud & Internal Audit

2.4 Corruption & Public Sector Fraud

2.5 International Financial Reporting

2.6 Money Laundering & Terrorist Financing

CCFA Level 3 Exam

3.1 Advanced Forensic Accounting

3.2 Compliance, Ethics & Governance

3.3 Ethics & Financial Forensics

3.4 International Criminal Law

3.5 Fraud Audit & Assurance

The CCFA exam is rigorous, tough and credible. It will take consistent determination to earn the CCFA credential. The CCFA credential is the global certification for truly qualified forensic accountants. CCFA's are saving government and corporations millions of dollars every day through the dint of the CCFA's skills and competence.

CCFAs are required to comply with CPE provisions of the Institute. To maintain the CCFA designation and be in good standing, 30 CPE hours per year are mandatory.

References

Benny K B Kwok, Forensic Accountancy 1st and 2nd editions published by LexisNexis 2002 and 2008

External links

Association of Certified Fraud Examiners
Association of Certified Forensic Accounting Professionals
International Institute of Certified Forensic Accountants,Inc. IICFA
International Institute of Certified Forensic Investigation Professionals, IICFIP
Certified in Financial Forensics
Hong Kong Institute of Certified Public Accountants HKICPA
Forensic Accounting Certifications
HKICPA training in forensic accountancy
Institute of Chartered Accountants in England and Wales ICAEW
ICAEW forensics group

Forensic occupations